Krossen is a village in Vinje Municipality in Vestfold og Telemark county, Norway. The village is located near the eastern shore of the lake Totak, just to the southeast of the village of Raulandsgrend in the Rauland area of the municipality.

References

Vinje
Villages in Vestfold og Telemark